The 1837 Vermont gubernatorial election was held on September 5, 1837.

Incumbent Whig Governor Silas H. Jennison defeated Democratic nominee William Czar Bradley with 55.65% of the vote.

General election

Candidates
William Czar Bradley, Democratic, former U.S. Representative, Democratic candidate for Governor in 1834, 1835 and 1836
Silas H. Jennison, Whig, incumbent Governor

Results

Notes

References

1837
Vermont
Gubernatorial